Gregor Deschwanden (born 27 February 1991) is a Swiss ski jumper.  His best individual World Cup showing so far is 10th in an individual large hill in Germany in 2013.

Deschwanden competed for Switzerland in the 2014 Winter Olympics in Sochi, Russia and placed 25th in the men's individual normal hill and 15th in the men's individual large hill competitions.

References

1991 births
Living people
Swiss male ski jumpers
Olympic ski jumpers of Switzerland
Ski jumpers at the 2014 Winter Olympics
Ski jumpers at the 2018 Winter Olympics
Ski jumpers at the 2022 Winter Olympics